Lasius alienus, or cornfield ant, is a species of ant in the subfamily Formicinae (family Formicidae). Workers have a length of about 2–4 mm, Queens are larger (7–9 mm).

Distribution
They live in Europe, from Spain to the Caucasus; populations in North America are now considered to be a separate species, Lasius americanus.

Genetics
Genome type Lasius alienus: 0,31 m (C value)

Mutualism 
The butterfly Plebejus argus lays eggs near nests of the ant L. alienus, forming a mutualistic relationship. This mutualistic relationship benefits the adult butterfly by reducing the need for parental investment. Once the eggs hatch, the ants chaperone the larvae, averting the attacks of predatory organisms like wasps and spiders as well as parasites. In return, the ants receive a saccharine secretion fortified with amino acids from an eversible gland on the larvae's back. As first instar larvae prepare to pupate, the ants carry the larvae into their nests. Once the larvae become pupae, the ants continue to provide protection against predation and parasitism.

References

Seifert, B. (1992). A taxonomic revision of the Palaearctic members of the ant subgenus Lasius s. str. (Hymenoptera: Formicidae). Abhand. Be. Naturkundemus. Goerlitz 66 (5): 1-66.
Wilson, E. O. (1955). A monographic revision of the ant genus Lasius, Ph.D. dissert., Harvard University, 105 p.

External links

alienus
Hymenoptera of Europe
Insects described in 1850
Taxa named by Thomas Ignatius Maria Forster